Triple One are a hip hop/rap group from Inner West Sydney, Australia. Members include Lil Dijon (vocalist), Marty Bugatti and Obi Ill Terrors (rappers), and Billy Gunns (production).

They are best known for their single "Butter", which reached high rotation on Australian youth radio station Triple J. They released the EP The Libertine 2 in June 2019.

In November 2021, the band released  "Come Over" and announced their first regional tour of Australia.

Band members
Current
 Lil Dijon – vocals 
 Marty Bugatti Large – rap vocals 
 Obi Ill Terrors – rap vocals 
 Billy Gunns – production

Discography

Studio albums

Mixed tapes

Extended plays

Singles

As lead artist

Awards

APRA Awards
The APRA Awards are held in Australia and New Zealand by the Australasian Performing Right Association to recognise songwriting skills, sales and airplay performance by its members annually. Triple One has been nominated for one award.

|-
| 2020
| "Butter"
| Most Performed Urban Work of the Year
| 
|-

J Awards
The J Awards are an annual series of Australian music awards that were established by the Australian Broadcasting Corporation's youth-focused radio station Triple J. They commenced in 2005.

! 
|-
| J Awards of 2021
| "Blood Rave" (directed by Serwah Attafuah)
| Australian Video of the Year
| 
|

Rolling Stone Australia Awards
The Rolling Stone Australia Awards are awarded annually in January or February by the Australian edition of Rolling Stone magazine for outstanding contributions to popular culture in the previous year.

! 
|-
| 2021
| "Salina"
| Best Single
| 
| 
|-

References

2016 establishments in Australia
Musical groups established in 2016
Musical groups from Sydney
Musical quartets
Sony Music Australia artists